Illinois Route 49 (IL 49) is a  north–south state highway in east-central Illinois. It runs from Willow Hill at IL 33 north to the beginning of the U.S. Route 45/52 concurrency near Ashkum.

Route description 

Illinois 49 runs for its length entirely as an undivided surface highway. It serves minor cities between Illinois Route 1 to the east and Interstate 57 to the west.

History 
SBI Route 49 originally ran from Willow Hill all the way to Chicago along what is now U.S. Route 52/45 and Illinois Route 50. In February 1933, the section of IL 49 from Kankakee to Chicago was designated as part of the Egyptian Highway. In 1942, U.S. Route 54 was extended to Chicago along Illinois 49 north of Kankakee. In 1969, Illinois 49 was truncated to its current northern end. When U.S. 54 was pulled back to Pittsfield in 1972, Illinois 50 took the place of Illinois 49 and U.S. 54.

Major intersections

References

External links 

 Illinois Highway Ends: Illinois Route 49

049
U.S. Route 52
U.S. Route 45
Transportation in Jasper County, Illinois
Transportation in Cumberland County, Illinois
Transportation in Clark County, Illinois
Transportation in Coles County, Illinois
Transportation in Edgar County, Illinois
Transportation in Douglas County, Illinois
Transportation in Champaign County, Illinois
Transportation in Vermilion County, Illinois
Transportation in Iroquois County, Illinois